Vaiochori is a village of the Volvi municipality. Before the 2011 local government reform it was part of the municipality of Egnatia. The 2011 census recorded 69 inhabitants in the village. Vaiochori is a part of the community of Nymfopetra.

See also
 List of settlements in the Thessaloniki regional unit

References

Populated places in Thessaloniki (regional unit)